The Burning of Fairfield refers to the action of the American Revolutionary War at Fairfield, Connecticut on July 7, 1779 after a British landing force under the command of General William Tryon attacked the town, engaged and dispersed its militia forces, and burned down the vast majority of its buildings. Much of the action took place in areas that are now part of Bridgeport, Southport, and Westport.

Background
The attack was the second stop along Tryon's raid of Connecticut's rebellious coastline, in which 2,600 regulars launched a punitive campaign on Fairfield and New Haven from their base in Long Island. 

The raid was actually Tryon's second on Fairfield County, after his near identical 1777 landings at Compo Beach leading to the destruction of Continental supplies at Danbury and a major showdown at Ridgefield with David Wooster, Benedict Arnold and 700 Connecticut militiamen, including many from Fairfield. Present-day Fairfield had been spared action in that raid as the action happened to its west in what is now Westport. 

Until recently, the defense of southwestern Connecticut had been the domain of Brig. Gen. Gold Selleck Silliman. But, in May of 1779, two months before Tryon's second raid, Silliman was kidnapped from his Fairfield home by a band of tories and taken to Oyster Bay. Silliman's house on Jennings Road is one of the few left standing in the town today. In the months leading up to the raid, Fairfield had developed a reputation for providing materiel and personnel to the continental war effort, with a great deal of privateers passing through Black Rock Harbor.

On July 5, 1779, the British landed at New Haven, raided the town and the nearby Black Rock Fort, and then returned to Long Island. Gen. Garth was able to spare the town from burning in spite of Tryon's orders to the contrary.

Attack
Tryon's raiding force left their base in Huntington in the morning hours of July 7. Soon after, the British flotilla was spotted by militia forces at a (now submerged) fort at Grover's Point in Black Rock Harbor. The town was alerted and most unarmed civilians fled inland. Tryon and his initial landing force of 800 infantry landed on present-day South Pine Creek beach in the afternoon and marched inland towards the town center. Tryon's force was of extremely high fighting quality, consisting of "two bodies of Fusileers, the Guards, the Fifty-fourth regiment of foot and the King’s American (loyalist) regiment.” The American forces amounted to scattered elements of the 4th Connecticut Militia and Lt. Isaac Jarvis's guns at Grover's Point in present-day Bridgeport. Tryon's force disembarked under harassing fire from Jarvis's guns before meeting a party of the town's notable residents. The British sent Parson Sayre, the town's Presbyterian minister, to the militia with an entreaty to surrender. A militia Col. Samuel Whiting responded firmly in the negative.

Tryon's force captured and began to sack Fairfield, with a detachment giving the village of Greens Farms in present-day Westport the same treatment. Militia forces harassed them and briefly held them up at Round Hill, but ultimately withdrew on the first day of fighting. Their most serious delaying action was the burning of the bridge at Ash Creek, which ended Tryon's plan to combine the two forces and take Jarvis's fort at Black Rock Harbor. Tryon's frustration is cited by period sources as the motivation for the burning of the town the next day. Throughout the night of July 7, Jarvis and his 23 men traded fire with the British flotilla. Tryon sent multiple detachments to capture the fort, but those attacks were repulsed at some cost. Thus the small fort, and Black Rock Harbor, survived the raid.

After the initial attack on the town, Tryon's forces had been reinforced by 1,700 men including many German jägers and commanded by General George Garth. This force landed "near Mill River", presumably near present-day downtown Southport, Connecticut and marched up Sasco Hill toward Tryon's force. Much of the town was, at first, spared burning. However, the next day, July 8, the British withdraw with the Germans acting as their rear guard. As the furious townsfolk bore down on them, the Germans began to burn the town wholesale on their way back to their boats. The town's Congregational minister Rev. Andrew Eliot, who was present among the rebels, later recalled the Germans as "the vilest [soldiers] ever let loose among men". Notably, the 1732 Burr Homestead, site of John Hancock's wedding and property of Thaddeus Burr, uncle of Aaron Burr, was also burned despite Tryon's written assurances to Burr's wife.

Commemoration 
Fairfield eventually recovered and has experienced many booms in population and prosperity owing to its easy connections to New York City. However, for many years after the British attack the town served as perhaps the most visible reminder of the price Connecticut paid in the war. In 1789 President George Washington visited Penfield's Sun Tavern and remarked that “The destructive evidences of British cruelty are yet visible both in Norwalk and Fairfield; as there are the chimneys of many burnt houses standing in them yet." As Washington alluded to, Norwalk was the next target in Tryon's raid after Fairfield and suffered a similar fate.

Each year volunteers stage re-creations and guided tours centering on the movements of the British on that day and the few colonial houses which survived the flames.

References

Fairfield, Connecticut
Conflicts in 1779
Battles of the American Revolutionary War in Connecticut
Battles involving Great Britain
Battles involving the United States
Battles in the Northern Coastal theater of the American Revolutionary War after Saratoga